Santiria tomentosa is a species of plant in the family Burseraceae. It is found in Indonesia, Malaysia, the Philippines, and Singapore.

References

tomentosa
Least concern plants
Taxonomy articles created by Polbot